The 1949 St. Louis Browns season involved the Browns finishing 7th in the American League with a record of 53 wins and 101 losses.

Offseason 
 October 4, 1948: Sam Dente was traded by the Browns to the Washington Senators for John Sullivan, Tom Ferrick and $25,000.
 December 16, 1948: Bob Savage was selected off waivers by the Browns from the Philadelphia Athletics.

Regular season

Season standings

Record vs. opponents

Roster

Player stats

Batting

Starters by position 
Note: Pos = Position; G = Games played; AB = At bats; H = Hits; Avg. = Batting average; HR = Home runs; RBI = Runs batted in

Other batters 
Note: G = Games played; AB = At bats; H = Hits; Avg. = Batting average; HR = Home runs; RBI = Runs batted in

Pitching

Starting pitchers 
Note: G = Games pitched; IP = Innings pitched; W = Wins; L = Losses; ERA = Earned run average; SO = Strikeouts

Other pitchers 
Note: G = Games pitched; IP = Innings pitched; W = Wins; L = Losses; ERA = Earned run average; SO = Strikeouts

Relief pitchers 
Note: G = Games pitched; W = Wins; L = Losses; SV = Saves; ERA = Earned run average; SO = Strikeouts

Farm system 

LEAGUE CHAMPIONS: AberdeenSalinas club moved to Tijuana, August 5, 1949

References

External links
1949 St. Louis Browns team at Baseball-Reference
1949 St. Louis Browns season at baseball-almanac.com

St. Louis Browns seasons
Saint Louis Browns season
St Louis Browns